Mamukh, also rendered as Mamaq or Mamoq may refer to:
 Mamukh-e Olya
 Mamukh-e Sofla